Tightrope Pictures is a British television production company, founded in late 2003 by writer Paul Abbott and producer Hilary Bevan-Jones, who had worked together that year on the successful BBC drama serial State of Play. The company has been responsible for several high-profile drama productions for the BBC, including the Richard Curtis-written The Girl in the Café (BBC One, 2005) and an adaptation of William Golding's novel To the Ends of the Earth (BBC Two, 2005).

External links
Tightrope Pictures on the web
BBC Press Office information on the company from The Girl in the Café press pack.

Television production companies of the United Kingdom